Salif Diagne is a Senegalese former football forward who played for the Senegal national team.

Honours

Clubs
Raja CA
CAF Champions League (1): 1989

International
Africa Cup of Nations: Group stage in 1986

External links
 Profile - Home of Football Statistics and History

Living people
Footballers from Dakar
Association football forwards
Senegalese footballers
Senegal international footballers
1986 African Cup of Nations players
ASC Jeanne d'Arc players
Raja CA players
Botola players
Senegalese expatriate footballers
Expatriate footballers in Morocco
Senegalese expatriate sportspeople in Morocco
Year of birth missing (living people)